Mikhail Lukin; born 10 October 1971) is a Russian theoretical and experimental physicist and a professor at Harvard University. He was elected a member of the National Academy of Sciences in 2018.

Early life
Mikhail "Misha" Lukin was born in Moscow, Russia. He studied physics and mathematics at MIPT, and he graduated in 1993. Following his graduation, he joined Texas A&M University where he wrote a research paper titled Quantum Coherence and Interference in Optics and Laser Spectroscopy which he used for his Ph.D. thesis. Between this and 1994 he was a visiting scientist to Max Planck Institute of Quantum Optics in Garching, Germany. Later on he became a postdoc at Texas A&M University and then became a fellow, and later joint director, of the Institute for Theoretical Atomic and Molecular Physics a division of Center for Astrophysics  Harvard & Smithsonian. In 2001 he became an assistant professor at Harvard and three years later became its professor.

Research
In 2005 he proposed an idea to use quantum computing mail rather than Email which is already used by both Harvard and Boston Universities. He and Vladan Vuletic experimentally confirmed a new type of matter in which photonic molecules can be used to create a lightsaber-like technology.

In a 2013 interview with The Harvard Crimson he explained that he observed the matter the same way as it is in the movies, but unlike the movies the objects don't pass through each other but rather behave like solid objects.

Lukin is a Fellow of the Optical Society of America.

Awards
2000 The Optical Society of America Adolph Lomb Medal
2009 – I.I. Rabi Prize
2021 - The Optical Society of America Charles Hard Townes Medal for pioneering theoretical and experimental contributions to quantum nonlinear optics and quantum information science and technology, and for the development and application of nanoscale quantum systems for sensing

References

External links

Mikhail Lukin

1971 births
Living people
Russian physicists
Texas A&M University alumni
Moscow Institute of Physics and Technology alumni
Harvard University faculty
Members of the United States National Academy of Sciences
Fellows of the American Physical Society